The Colville Channel is one of three channels connecting the Hauraki Gulf with the Pacific Ocean to the northeast of Auckland, New Zealand. It is the easternmost channel, lying between the southern end of Great Barrier Island and Cape Colville at the northern tip of the Coromandel Peninsula. The tiny Channel Island lies in the centre of the channel.

The other two channels are the Cradock Channel and the Jellicoe Channel.

References

Hauraki Gulf
Straits of New Zealand
Great Barrier Island
Thames-Coromandel District
Landforms of the Auckland Region